Ompie Nkumbula-Liebenthal is a member of the Pan-African Parliament from Zambia. She sits on the Committee on Education, Science And Technology.

References

External links
 List of Members

Year of birth missing (living people)
Living people
Members of the Pan-African Parliament from Zambia
21st-century Zambian women politicians
21st-century Zambian politicians
Women members of the Pan-African Parliament